Rajesh Murugesan (born 14 May 1988) is an Indian music composer, best known for his compositions in Malayalam cinema for films like Neram and Premam.

Personal life
Murugesan was born in Nagercoil and he completed his schooling at Cochin Refineries School, Ambalamugal, while graduating with a Degree from SAE International College, Chennai in 2008. He married actress Aishwarya Raghavan on 22 January 2020.

Career
Rajesh made his debut as a music director in Neram a Tamil - Malayalam bilingual film which was directed by Alphonse Putharen and released in 2013. The song Pistah also featured as IPL promo song for the year 2016.

Filmography

Awards

 Asianet Comedy Awards 2015 for Best Comical Scene Song
 CPC Cine Awards 2015 for Best Music Director
 Vanitha Film Awards 2016 for Best Music Director
 Asianet Film Awards 18th Asianet film awards for Best Music Director
 5th South Indian International Movie Awards for Best Music Director Malayalam
 IIFA 2016 Award for Best Music Director Malayalam 2016

References

External links
 

Living people
Malayalam film score composers
Tamil film score composers
Indian male musicians
21st-century classical composers
Film musicians from Kerala
Musicians from Kochi
1988 births
21st-century Indian composers
Indian male film score composers
21st-century male musicians